This is a complete list of operas by the French composer Jules Massenet (1842–1912). Several of Massenet's operas were premiered by the Opéra-Comique in Paris, first at the second Salle Favart (Favart 2), followed by the Théâtre Lyrique on the Place du Châtelet (Lyrique), and then the third Salle Favart (Favart 3).

List

References

Sources
 Thompson, Kenneth and Wright, Stella J (1992), "Massenet, Jules" in The New Grove Dictionary of Opera, ed. Stanley Sadie (London) 
 Wild, Nicole; Charlton, David (2005). Théâtre de l'Opéra-Comique Paris: répertoire 1762-1972. Sprimont, Belgium: Editions Mardaga. .

 
Lists of operas by composer
Lists of compositions by composer
French music-related lists